The Yuba–Sutter Regional Arts Council (YSRAC) is the official Yuba County, California, USA and Sutter County, California, USA arts council.

The YSRAC is the public agency designated by the counties of Yuba and Sutter as the local partner with the California Arts Council.

The purpose of the California Arts Council State–Local Partnership Program is to increase public awareness of and participation in the arts, to serve as the cultural planning agency in partnership with both counties, to encourage local communities to reach their full potential by developing arts programs that serve local needs, and to provide access to professional quality arts in under-served areas throughout Yuba and Sutter counties.

History

Founded in 1981, YSRAC has focused on being a service organization to the arts, though it also serves a presenting organization as needed. Programming includes technical advice to artists and arts organizations, offering performance space at Lee Burrows Arts Center, arts information through print and electronic media, Borgamaria Lyric Opera, Very Special Arts Festival, and a year-round gallery space.

External links
Yuba–Sutter Regional Arts Council website

Arts councils of California
Yuba County, California
Sutter County, California
Government agencies established in 1981
1981 establishments in California